England competed at the 1990 Commonwealth Games in Auckland, New Zealand, between 24 January and 3 February 1990.  

England finished second in the medal table.

Medal table (top three)

The athletes that competed are listed below.

Athletics

Badminton

Bowls

Boxing

Cycling

Diving

Gymnastics
Artistic

Rhythmic

Judo

Shooting

Swimming

Synchronised swimming

Weightlifting

References

1990
Nations at the 1990 Commonwealth Games
Commonwealth Games